András Baronyi (September 13, 1892 – June 6, 1944) was a Hungarian swimmer and track and field athlete who competed in the 1908 Summer Olympics and in the 1912 Summer Olympics. He was born and died in Budapest.

In 1908 he was eliminated in the first round of the 200 metre breaststroke event. Four years later at the 1912 Olympics he finished fourth in the 100 metre backstroke competition. At the same Olympics he also finished seventh in the standing long jump contest.

References

External links
profile

1892 births
1944 deaths
Swimmers from Budapest
Hungarian male swimmers
Male breaststroke swimmers
Male backstroke swimmers
Hungarian male long jumpers
Olympic swimmers of Hungary
Olympic athletes of Hungary
Swimmers at the 1908 Summer Olympics
Swimmers at the 1912 Summer Olympics
Athletes (track and field) at the 1912 Summer Olympics
Athletes from Budapest